Johan Leysen (born 19 February 1950) is a Belgian actor. He has appeared in more than 130 films and television shows since 1977. He starred in the film De grens, which was screened in the Un Certain Regard section at the 1984 Cannes Film Festival. In 1998 he won the Golden Calf for Best Actor for his role in the movie Felice...Felice.... In the 2010 film The American, he appeared as Pavel, mysterious handler of Jack, the assassin character played by George Clooney.

Filmography

References

External links

1950 births
Living people
Belgian male film actors
Golden Calf winners
People from Hasselt
20th-century Belgian male actors
21st-century Belgian male actors